This scandal, involving Sergei Krivokrasov, occurred during 3rd game of 2003–04 Russian Hockey Super League playoff semifinals between Avangard Omsk and HC Lada Togliatti. At 3:05 left in the third period, Lada Head coach, Petr Vorobiev, asked for Krivokrasov's stick measurement. The referee for the game, Sergei Gusev, accepted the request, however delayed the procedure by several minutes. Stick was measured and proved legal, so Lada was given a minor penalty for delaying the game.

However, it was witnessed by several Lada staff members, that Krivokrasov had changed his stick during the delay—and reported immediately to game officials. This appeal was denied, so Vorobiev ordered his team to leave the ice as a protest. After the short consultation with game inspector, referee finally called minor and misconduct penalties against Krivokrasov, but Lada refused to return, since their minor penalty for delaying the game stayed intact. 1:0 victory (the score before the incident) was awarded then to Avangard.

Several days later, game officials for this game were suspended until the end of the season for "critical mistakes in measurement procedures". Lada was fined, and Petr Vorobiev served a 5-game suspension for League regulations violation.

References 
  - Sovetsky Sport, 2004/3/30, page 31
  - Sport Express, 2004/3/30, page 1
  - Sovetsky Sport, 2004/4/2, page 2
2003–04 in Russian ice hockey